Meduza, Meluza or Meluzina is a mythical creature in Russian folklore. She was depicted in a Russian lubok of the 17th or 18th century. She is described as half-woman, half-snake, or as the half-woman, half-fish creature. She is also said to be the deity of deception.

Appearance
She is represented as a sea monster with the head of a beautiful dark-haired maiden, having the body and belly of a striped beast, a dragon tail with a snake's mouth at the end, and legs resembling those of an elephant with the same snake mouths at the end. She also wears a crown. 

According to belief, her snake mouths contained a deadly dragon poison. She was said to live in the Sea near the Ethiopian abyss, or in the Western Ocean.

See also
 Medusa
 Melusine

References

Sources
 

 

  

Russian art
Folk art 
Russian folklore
Russian mythology
Slavic legendary creatures